Billy Rogers (born 29 March 1989) is an Australian professional rugby league footballer who has played as a .

Playing career
As a youngster Rogers played junior rugby league for Gympie Devils. Rogers then a teenager signed with the Melbourne Storm in 2007, playing in the NYC until 2009, winning a NYC title in 2009 as captain of the Storm.

In 2011, Rogers signed a 2-year deal with the Parramatta Eels. He made his NRL debut in RD3 2011, against the South Sydney Rabbitohs. He soon was released from his contract, leaving for personal reasons.

After leaving Parramatta, Rogers signed with the Gympie Devils, winning two premierships with them.  Rogers later played in the United States of America with the Jacksonville Axemen.  In 2015, Rogers played for the Northern Outlaws who compete in the Sunshine Coast Gympie Rugby League competition.  
On 27 January 2017, it was announced that Rogers had signed with the Underbank Rangers who play in the English Pennine League.

References

External links
NRL profile

1989 births
Living people
Australian rugby league players
Jacksonville Axemen players
Parramatta Eels players
Wentworthville Magpies players
Rugby league locks
Rugby league players from Queensland